Fred Pickard (1938 – December 31, 2021) was an American football player and coach. An honorable mention fullback at Florida State University in his college days, Pickard served as the head football coach at the University of Tennessee–Martin from 1982 to 1985, compiling a record of 12–31–1. Pickard died in Dickson, Tennessee on December 31, 2021, at the age of 83.

Head coaching record

College

References

1938 births
2021 deaths
American football fullbacks
Florida State Seminoles football players
High school football coaches in Florida
UT Martin Skyhawks football coaches